Oak Street Health, Inc. is a health care network of primary care centers for older adults on Medicare. In February 2023, CVS Health announced that it planned to spend $10.6 billion to acquire the company.

History 
Oak Street Health was founded in 2012 by Mike Pykosz, Griffin Myers and Geoff Price and is headquartered in Chicago, Illinios.  Oak Street Health is the only primary care provider endorsed by the AARP. Oak Street Health operates in helping older adults stay healthy by providing preventive care, education and social activities to support overall health well-being.

In October 2021, Oak Street Health acquired RubiconMD, a healthtech company for $130 million, the deal enables Oak Street to integrate its care model with virtual specialty care of RubiconMD.

On February 8, 2023 CVS Health announced it has entered into a definitive agreement to acquire Oak Street Health in an all-cash transaction at $39 per share, representing an enterprise value of approximately $10.6 billion.

IPO 

Oak Street Health has raised a total of $105.3M in funding over 4 rounds. In August 2020 Oak Street Health, went public and raised $328 million in its Initial Public offering. The company offered 15.6 million shares at $21 per share on the New York Stock Exchange, where it is traded under the ticker “OSH.”

Recognition 
Oak street co-founder, Mike Pykosz was listed among List of 300 people transforming business in 2020 by Business Insider, as well as among 100 Most Influential People in Healthcare by Modern Healthcare.

In 2020, Oak Street was listed among 8 primary care companies building a new future for medicine during the pandemic, by Business Insider.

Operations 
Oak Street Health head office is based in Chicago, Illinios. It began operating in 2012. By January 2020, it had expanded to 50 centers in eight states. By October 2021, there were more than 100 centers in 18 states; by February 2023, that had increased to more than 160 centers in 21 states.

References

External links

Seniors' organizations
2012 establishments in Illinois
Companies listed on the New York Stock Exchange
Announced mergers and acquisitions